Andrew Mellon (born 3 November 1995 in Bangor) is an Irish sprinter. Born in Northern Ireland, he represents Ireland. He attended Bangor Grammar School from 2006-2014.
He contributed to the third place of the relay 4x400 meters during the 2019 European Team Championships in Sandnes, permitting the Irish team not to be relegated.

References

External links
IAAF Athlete’s profile

1995 births
Irish male sprinters
Male sprinters from Northern Ireland
People from Bangor, County Down
Living people
Athletes (track and field) at the 2019 European Games
European Games competitors for Ireland